Hamo Sahyan (also known as Hmayak Sahaki Grigoryan; April 14, 1914 – July 17, 1993) was an Armenian poet and translator.

Biography 
In 1939 Sahyan graduated from the Baku Pedagogical institute. In 1941 he moved to Yerevan, and then served in the Soviet Navy during World War II. He worked in "Avangard" and "Vozni" newspapers, edited "Grakan tert". The first collection of his poems was published in 1946. Sahyan was awarded by the State Prize of Armenia for his "Sezam, batsvir" (1972) book. Sahyan died in 1993 and was buried at Komitas Pantheon in Yerevan.

References

External links

 Hamo Sahyan's Selection of Poems
 Hamo Sahyan's biography 
 Don't Mark Me Absent. The Last Book by the Poet

20th-century Armenian poets
1914 births
1993 deaths
Armenian translators
20th-century translators
Burials at the Komitas Pantheon
Armenian male poets
20th-century male writers